Moody's Aaa Corporate Bond, also known as "Moody's Aaa" for short is an investment bond that acts as an index of the performance of all bonds given an Aaa rating by Moody's Investors Service. This corporate bond is often used in macroeconomics as an alternative to the federal ten-year Treasury Bill as an indicator of the interest rate. Moody's and other investment companies have other less common investment bonds that are also used. 

Moody's Seasoned Aaa Corporate Bond Yield are available at the St. Louis Federal Reserve Economic Data (FRED) database.

See also
Bond Valuation — Yield To Maturity
Dividend yield
Bond duration
Coupon rate
Moody's Analytics

External links
Daily Moody's Seasoned Aaa Corporate Bond Yield
Weekly Moody's Seasoned Aaa Corporate Bond Yield
Monthly Moody's Seasoned Aaa Corporate Bond Yield

Bonds (finance)